In quantum chemistry, the Dunham expansion is an expression for the rotational-vibrational energy levels of a diatomic molecule:

The constant coefficients  are called Dunham parameters with  representing the electronic energy. The expression derives from a semiclassical treatment of a perturbational approach to deriving the energy levels. The Dunham parameters are typically calculated by a least-squares fitting procedure of energy levels with the quantum numbers.

Relation to conventional band spectrum constants

This table adapts the sign conventions from the book of Huber and Herzberg.

See also
 Rotational-vibrational spectroscopy

References

Spectroscopy
Molecular vibration